Strauss Airfield was an airfield in the Northern Territory of Australia in the locality of Noonamah constructed between 19 March to 27 April 1942  during World War II. It was also known as 27 Mile Field or Humpty Doo Strip.

History

The airfield was officially dedicated as Strauss Field in memory and honour of United States Captain Allison W. Strauss who was killed piloting a P-40 Kittyhawk from the 8th Pursuit Squadron ("The Blacksheep") of the 49th Fighter Group after crashing into Darwin harbour during a Japanese air raid on the Darwin RAAF airfield on 27 April 1942.

On 13 October 2003, the Strauss Airfield was added to the Northern Territory Heritage Register.

Japanese Bombing Raids against Strauss Airfield
26 November 1942 (03.20 am)
27 November 1942 (03:56 - 04:46 am)

Units based at Strauss Airfield
No. 76 Squadron RAAF (P-40)
No. 452 Squadron RAAF (Spitfire)
No. 457 Squadron RAAF (Spitfire)

See also
 List of airports in the Northern Territory

References

External links

Lt. Col Bernard L. Robinson Reports on the NT June 1942
Strauss Airfield - NT Heritage Listing
OzatWar website

Former Royal Australian Air Force bases
World War II airfields in Australia
Defunct airports in the Northern Territory
Airports established in 1942
1942 establishments in Australia
Northern Territory Heritage Register